Luís Romano de Madeira Melo (10 June 1922 in Ponta do Sol on Santo Antão, Cabo Verde – 22 January 2010 in Brasil) was a bilingual poet, novelist, and folklorist who has written in Portuguese and the Capeverdean Crioulo of Santo Antão.

Biography
Born in the northernmost town of Ponta do Sol in the Capeverdean island of Santo Antão, he prefers to refer to the Capeverdean language as "língua cabo-verdiana". He collaborated along with additional publishers and founded the Morabeza review. An independent idealist, he edited local and international literary reviews.

In the late 1950s, Luís Romano joined the ideas of independence and became member of the PAIGC, captured by PIDE, he went to exile in Senegal, then Mauritania and Morocco where he travelled with an engineer from the salt industry, Algiers and Paris, Romano lived in Brazil for the remainder of his life. He visited his home country in Praia during the country's independence in 1975 and returned to Brazil.

In 1985, he wrote a historical book Cem Anos de Literatura Caboverdiana (Hundred Years of Cape Verdean Literature) relating to the past hundred years of literature of his country, it included notable writers of the time such as Eugénio Tavares, Baltasar Lopes da Silva (Osvaldo Alcântara), Jorge Barbosa Manuel Lopes, Henrique Teixeira de Sousa, Sergio Frusoni, Francisco Xavier da Cruz (B. Leza) and Ovídio Martins as well as the Claridade review in which some of the greatest writers took part, as well as Certeza and Morabeza.

He established the official linguistic material of Kriolander in the whole archipelago. He published his first novel Famintos (Famine, Hunger), about the deaths of several Cape Verdeans during the drought of the 1940s, it was written in 1940, as it was censored at the time, it was published in Brazil in 1962. He also wrote poems especially Negrume (Lzimparim) which was published in Rio de Janeiro in 1973.

One of his poems can be found on the CD Poesia de Cabo Verde e Sete Poemas de Sebastião da Gama (2007) by Afonso Dias.

Publications 
 Famintos, Romance de um povo (1962, novel in Portuguese)
 Clima (1963): Poems in Portuguese, Crioulo and in French
 Cabo Verde-Renascença de uma civilização no Atlântico médio (1967): Collection of poems and short-stories in Portuguese and Crioulo.
 Negrume/Lzimparin (1973): Short stories in Crioulo with translations in Portuguese
 Cem Anos de Literatura Caboverdiana [Hundred Years of Cape Verdean Literature] (1985) - historical work of national literature from Eugénio Tavares to 1985
 Ilha (1991): Short stories from "Europafrica" and "Brasilamerica"; in Portuguese and partially in Crioulo)
 Kriolanda - Estigmas, 1999, São Vicente
 Kabverd Civilização e Cultura, 2000, Rio de Janeiro

Short-Stories 
 "Nho Zidôr" (in Ilha), "Pasaport Kabverd" (in Ilha), "Daluz" (in Negrume), "Tánha" (in Negrume), "Destino" (in Negrume), "Estórias de Tipêde i Tilôbe" (in Cabo Verde-Renascença de uma civilização...)

Notes

Further reading
Voix des îles du Cap-Vert de Luis Romano (Voices of the Cape Verde Islands by Luís Romano), article by Pierrette et Gérard Chalendar in Éthiopiques, no 27, July 1981 
"Romano, Luís", Merriam-Webster's encyclopedia of literature, Merriam-Webster, 1995, p. 964

External links
Ti Lobo e Ti Pedro – Crioulo of Santo Antão
Poems
Luís Romano: Heritage of Two Nations 
 Luís Romano (in Portuguese)
Luís Romano vai ser homenageado no Brasil 
Kapverd - Civilização & Cultura

Cape Verdean poets
1922 births
2010 deaths
People from Santo Antão, Cape Verde
Cape Verdean expatriates in Brazil
Cape Verdean novelists
Cape Verdean short story writers
20th-century poets
20th-century novelists
20th-century short story writers